The 2014–15 season was the 125th season of competitive association football and 95th season in the Football League played by Brentford, an English football club based in Brentford in the London Borough of Hounslow. Their second-place finish in the 2013–14 season guaranteed promotion to the Championship from League One. The season covers the period from 1 July 2014 to 30 June 2015.

Season review

Pre-season 
After securing the signing of former loanee Alan Judge, Brentford continued strengthening their squad with the arrival of Marcos Tébar, Andre Gray, Moses Odubajo, Scott Hogan, Daniel O'Shaughnessy, Tommy Smith and Nick Proschwitz. Following the rejection of a new contract, Clayton Donaldson signed for Birmingham City and fellow striker Luke Norris departed for Gillingham. Will Grigg moved to MK Dons on a season-long loan and Alex Pritchard joined the Bees on a similar loan deal from Tottenham Hotspur. Jake Bidwell, Stuart Dallas and David Button signed new deals that secured their services until 2017 while the Development Squad was strengthened with new additions and the retention of existing squad members.

August 
Brentford's season began at home with a 1–1 draw against London rivals Charlton Athletic. Igor Vetokele put the visitors ahead in the 63rd minute heading in from an in-swinging corner. The Addicks had a chance to wrap the game up soon after but failed to capitalise from an open goal when David Button was caught away from his line. Debutant Tommy Smith came off the bench to grab an equaliser for the Bees, slotting home via a deflection in the 85th minute. In the first round of the League Cup Brentford needed extra time and a penalty shoot out to see off League Two side Dagenham & Redbridge. In a 6–6 thriller Stuart Dallas scored a brace, before Nick Proschwitz, Andre Gray and Montell Moore scored their first goals for the club. Harlee Dean netted a sixth in extra time to bring the match to penalties, and the Daggers missed two as Brentford converted four in a row to secure the win.

Spanish midfielder Jota signed from Celta de Vigo on a permanent deal and Arsenal midfielder Jon Toral joined on a season-long loan on 15 August. The Bees suffered their first defeat of the new campaign away to Bournemouth at Dean Court with Junior Stanislas scoring the only goal of the match in the 72nd minute in an even contest. Three days later a 2–1 win away to Blackpool moved the team up to 12th in the league table. After going a goal down an Alex Pritchard strike levelled the teams at half time. A persistent Stuart Dallas slotted home in the 52nd minute and The Bees held on to gain their first away win in the Championship. Ex-Bee Clayton Donaldson returned to Griffin Park with Birmingham City on 23 August and was brought down in Brentford's penalty area by Tony Craig which resulted in Craig's dismissal. Paul Caddis sent Button the wrong way to convert the penalty and put the Blues ahead. Moses Odubajo capitalised on a long ball from his own half in the second period and deftly chipped the Birmingham keeper to level the score.

Fulham were Brentford's opponents in the second round of the League Cup and arrived at Griffin Park for the first time in 16 years on 26 August. Ross McCormack netted in the 68th minute to give Fulham the lead and the visitors maintained a solid defence to prevent the Bees from equalising, sending them out of the Cup. Having met the club's valuation, Wigan Athletic were given permission to speak to and agree terms with Adam Forshaw, whilst Jake Reeves had his contract terminated by mutual agreement leaving him free to sign for Swindon Town. Brentford ended August with a win away to Rotherham United. A first half injury time goal from Gray and a second half injury time goal from Proschwitz gave the Bees a 2–0 victory and moved the team up to 8th in the league table.

September 
Adam Forshaw's move to Wigan Athletic was confirmed on transfer deadline day. Portuguese striker Betinho joined on a season long loan from Sporting Lisbon as Alfie Mawson extended his loan period with Wycombe Wanderers until the beginning of January 2015. Scott Hogan, who was carried off injured during the Rotherham match, was confirmed to have injured the anterior cruciate ligament in his left knee ruling him out for most of the season. 
Brentford gained their first home win of the campaign against Brighton following the 2 week International break. The Bees were 2–0 up with goals from Moses Odubajo and Andre Gray before Gordon Greer volleyed home to send the teams in 2–1 at the break. Jonathan Douglas scored in the 55th minute to put the home side three up, and although Danny Holla netted another for the Seagulls, Brentford held on for the win moving them up to 6th place in the league table.

A solid performance in goal from John Ruddy denied Brentford during the first half of their home encounter with Norwich City and the Bees were punished for their lack of shot conversion in the second half with goals from Alexander Tettey and Cameron Jerome giving the visitors a 3–0 victory.
Following the match, Alan McCormack signed a new contract with the club, extending his stay until 2016 with an option of a further year. The losing momentum continued away to Middlesbrough with Brentford failing to find their rhythm and returning to London the wrong side of a 4–0 scoreline.

A missed penalty from James Tarkowski did not derail Brentford as they got back to winning ways with a victory over Leeds United at Griffin Park on 27 September. Jota scored his first goal in English football to put the team ahead and an opportunistic strike from Alan McCormack in the second half secured the points. Three days later at Vicarage Road a Jonathan Douglas goal levelled the score after the Bees had gone 1–0 down after Odion Ighalo scored from the rebound of his saved penalty. Brentford held on until the 70th minute but were defeated by an unstoppable volley from Matěj Vydra from just outside the penalty area, and they ended the month 12th place in the Championship table.

October 
First half goals from Jota and Alex Pritchard and a third in the second half from Jonathan Douglas gave Brentford a winning start to October at home to Reading. Brentford's visit to Wigan saw the first meeting of the ex-management team of Rösler and Warburton. Despite chances from both sides, strong defensive performances kept the game goalless.

Harlee Dean returned to the starting line up in place of James Tarkowski as Brentford entertained Sheffield Wednesday at Griffin Park to celebrate 125 years since the club's formation. Brentford slipped to 12th place in league with the game ending in a second 0–0 draw. An unchanged line-up travelled to Bolton for the final game of October. An even first half finished goalless before Bolton broke the deadlock with an opener from Neil Danns. Alan McCormack was stretchered off and replaced by Tommy Smith before Mark Davies added a second for the home team. Substitute Jon Toral grabbed his first goal for the Bees but as the team sought an equaliser David Button was caught away from goal after moving upfield for a corner, and a quick move from Bolton allowed Craig Davies to net Bolton's third and secure the points.

It was confirmed on 31 October that Alan McCormack would be ruled out for three months due to the ankle ligament injury picked up during the Bolton match.

November 

November began with the arrival of league leaders Derby County to Griffin Park. Moses Odubajo moved to defence to replace the injured Alan McCormack whilst Jon Toral was handed a starting place and Toumani Diagouraga replaced Alex Pritchard in midfield. Derby went ahead in the 29th minute through Chris Martin. A strong run from Odubajo in the second half set up Andre Gray for an equaliser and substitute Stuart Dallas scored the winner for Brentford in the 90th minute to knock Derby off the top of the table and move the Bees up to 12th. Brentford emerged 3–1 winners against Nottingham Forest at The City Ground four days later. Goals from Toral, Gray and Pritchard gave the Bees a 3–0 lead before Michail Antonio netted an consolation goal for the home side.

Brentford made the short trip across London on 8 November to play Millwall and with Jonathan Douglas suspended Jota returned to the starting line up. Gray scored either side of the interval to put the Bees two goals up before Millwall got back into the game with two goals in quick succession to level the score. Millwall persisted to try to find a winner until Danny Shittu deflected Gray's shot into his own net in the 64th minute to hand the win to the visitors.

Following the International break, Fulham arrived at Griffin Park for a Friday night televised match in front of a sell out crowd of 12,225. After a goalless first half, Fulham gained the lead against the run of play through Hugo Rodallega and continued to pressure for a second goal. Brentford sought an equaliser and were successful in the 81st minute when Harlee Dean unleashed a powerful shot from the edge of the penalty area to beat Marcus Bettinelli. The game seemed to be heading for a draw until Jota took an opportunistic shot that was deflected into the Fulham goal.

Brentford secured five wins in five games during an unbeaten November after a 4–0 home win against Wolverhampton Wanderers. Alan Judge scored his first of the season in the first half before Stuart Dallas, Andre Gray and Jota guaranteed the win with goals in the final 15 minutes. In recognition of the months achievement Andre Gray and Mark Warburton won Player of the Month and Manager of the Month respectively.

December 

The first match of December was away to Huddersfield Town where Brentford's five match unbeaten run was brought to a halt. Sean Scannell put Huddersfield ahead in the 18th minute and they went further ahead with an own goal from Jake Bidwell at the start of the second half. Jonathan Douglas scored for Brentford soon after but the team were unable to come back and the defeat dropped them to 5th place in the league. A week later Brentford maintained 5th place with a win over Blackburn Rovers at Griffin Park. Goals from Douglas, Gray and Jota secured a 3–1 win, with Rudy Gestede scoring a consolation goal for the visitors via a deflection off Harlee Dean.

Three first half goals in a dominant half gave Brentford the advantage away to Cardiff City on 20 December. Alex Pritchard scored first with a strike from outside the penalty area and Gray added a second eleven minutes later with a deft chip over the Cardiff goalkeeper. Jota scored the third with an ambitious strike whilst surrounded by three defenders, but a rejuvenated Cardiff came out strong for the second half and despite scoring twice they could not overcome the deficit. The win moved Brentford into 3rd place in the league going into the Christmas period. Second played third as Ipswich Town arrived to Griffin Park on Boxing Day, and the visitors started strong with a goal in the first minute from Daryl Murphy.  Murphy added a second twenty minutes later and Paul Anderson scored a third to give Ipswich the lead at half time. Second half substitute Sam Saunders marked his return from injury with two second half goals as Brentford attempted a comeback, but a fourth from former Brentford loanee Tommy Smith ensured that Ipswich wrapped up the win and briefly topped the Championship table.

Brentford finished 2014 with a defeat away to Wolves on 28 December. After going two goals down Danny Batth scored an own goal in the 86th minute to make the score 2–1 dropping the Bees to 6th place in the table as 2014 ended. The club announced the signing of Scottish International Lewis Macleod from Rangers on 31 December, with the transfer to be made official on 3 January 2015.

January 

January began with the announcements that goalkeeper Richard Lee would be retiring at the end of the season and the contract extension of Jack Bonham. Brentford bowed out of the FA Cup with a home defeat to Brighton & Hove Albion, managed by ex-Bee Chris Hughton. First team regulars Jonathan Douglas, Tony Craig & David Button were rested and Jack Bonham made his first start of the season in goal with James Tarkowski and Harlee Dean running the central defence. The Bees started strong with Andre Gray unlucky not to covert early chances but Brighton broke the deadlock in the 88th minute through a Lewis Dunk goal and confirmed the victory in injury time with Chris O'Grady exposing a gap in the Brentford defence, sending the Seagulls through to the fourth round.

Brentford ended their three-game losing streak with a win over Rotherham on 10 January. Stuart Dallas volleyed from outside the penalty area in the 57th minute to give Brentford the lead and Alex Pritchard hit the post soon after but no more goals were to come as Brentford remained in fifth place after the 1–0 win. Following the FA Cup defeat earlier in the month, Brentford arrived in Brighton in the league on 17 January seeking a victory. Dallas linked up with Jake Bidwell before treading through a cross which Andre Gray chipped over the opposing keeper to put the Bees ahead. Jon Toral had an opportunity towards the end of the game to add another but was unlucky not to score as again the Bees emerged 1–0 winners.

Everton forward Chris Long joined the club on an initial one-month loan on 20 January. Jota put Brentford ahead against Norwich in the 21st minute after a strong run from Moses Odubajo resulted in a pass to Gray who set up the Spaniard for his seventh goal of the season. Nathan Redmond equalised for Norwich six minutes later through a deflection of James Tarkowski, sending the teams in level at half time. In the second half Gray was brought down in the Norwich box and Alex Pritchard stepped up to convert the penalty giving the Bees the lead. A stunning double save from David Button prevented Norwich equalising and the resulting win moved Brentford up to 4th position in the league.

James Tarkowski had a first half shot cleared off the line and Stuart Dallas hit the post before David Button brought down Patrick Bamford and Grant Leadbitter converted the resulting penalty to give Middlesbrough the lead on an early televised game on 1 February. Dallas saw another shot go a fraction over the crossbar in the second half and Jonathan Douglas had a last minute chance saved on the line as the Bees tried and ultimately failed to turn their dominant possession into an equaliser.

February 

Alex Pritchard had an on-target free kick saved in the first half before Toumani Diagouraga drove a low cross in front of the opposing goal for Pritchard to tap in during the second half against Leeds United. The 1–0 win moved Brentford up into 4th place in the league table. Jake Bidwell was dismissed in the first half three days later as the Bees entertained Watford at Griffin Park. Andre Gray put the home side up in the 52nd minute as he latched on to an upfield clearance from David Button to fire home. Button saved a penalty from Troy Deeney before being beaten twice by Odion Ighalo as Watford staged a late comeback to seal a 2–1 win. Despite having nearly two thirds of the possession, Brentford slipped to a second consecutive defeat away to Charlton Athletic at The Valley, as goals from Guðmundsson, Vetokele and Bulot gave The Addicks a 3–0 over the Bees.

League leaders Bournemouth arrived at Griffin Park on 21 February as Brentford sought to turn around their fortunes. An early goal from Jonathan Douglas put the Bees ahead until Marc Pugh equalised for the Cherries in the 30th minute. A long range free kick shot from Pritchard sailed past Artur Boruc just before half time and on-loan striker Chris Long scored his first for the club in the last minute of the match to give Brentford a 3–1 win which saw them consolidate 7th place in the league. Next up were bottom of the table Blackpool who Brentford comprehensively defeated 4–0 through a hat-trick from Jon Toral and a deflected strike from Andre Gray.

February ended with a defeat away at St Andrew's to Birmingham City. Paul Caddis drove in a low cross that ex-Bee Clayton Donaldson made a lunge for, but defending James Tarkowski connected with it, beating David Button and the resulting own goal was the only goal of the match the leaving the defeated Brentford in 7th position at the months end.

Managerial speculation and club statement 

On 10 February Matt Smith reported in The Times the Brentford owner Matthew Benham planned to dismiss Mark Warburton at the end of the season regardless of where they finished in the league. He also reported that talks had been held with Rayo Vallecano coach Paco Jémez about the managers job. Brentford responded later in the day with an official statement that acknowledged the stories but stopped at denying them.

On 17 February the club released a follow up statement confirming that Warburton, Assistant Manager David Weir and Sporting Director Frank McParland would be leaving the club at the end of the season.

March 

March began with a home win against Huddersfield Town at Griffin Park which moved Brentford back into the play off positions. Chris Long scored twice and Alex Pritchard and Jon Toral got a goal each as the Bees secured a third consecutive home win. The following game away to promotion rivals Ipswich Town saw Brentford hold onto a 1–1 draw despite a series of late chances from the home team. Daryl Murphy put Mick McCarthy's men ahead early on before Jonathan Douglas capitalised on a clearance following a Stuart Dallas effort to level the score.

Brentford failed to take the advantage over 9-man Cardiff City on 14 March as they slipped to a 1–2 defeat. Ex-Bee Simon Moore parried Pritchard's free kick shot into the path of Andre Gray who scored his 13th league goal of the campaign, but two costly defensive errors gifted Cardiff opportunities which they swiftly converted to seal the win. The Bees came back from behind twice to win away to Blackburn Rovers at Ewood Park. Long netted before half time and Jota along with Gray added to the tally in the second half to give Brentford a 3–2 victory. Relegation threatened Millwall went two goals ahead at Griffin Park on 21 March in a bid to secure their place in the Championship, but Martyn Woolford brought down Alan Judge five minutes from time and Pritchard converted the resulting penalty. Moses Odubajo grabbed an equaliser for Brentford in the last minute to deny the Lions a win, but the draw couldn't prevent the Bees slipping to 7th place in the league.

April 

Brentford got their promotion push back on track with a win over local rivals Fulham. 6,151 Brentford fans saw the Bees score four at Craven Cottage to complete a league double over the Cottagers with Stuart Dallas (2), Alan Judge and Jota scoring the goals. Three days later Nottingham Forest visited Griffin Park and after a goalless first half Tyler Walker put the away side ahead in the 61st minute. Todd Kane added a second but Brentford rallied and firstly Andre Gray and then Jota responded with goals in the last 10 minutes to level the score, with game finishing 2–2. Brentford visited Derby County on 11 April for a televised match. A dominant Brentford went ahead through Alex Pritchard in the 28th minute and held the upper hand until Darren Bent scored a late equaliser.

Pre season

Domestic friendlies

Championship

League results summary

Results and position by round

League table

Matches

August

September

October

November

December

January

February

March

April

May

Play-Offs

Score overview

FA Cup

Matches

League Cup

Matches

First Team squad 
Players' ages are as of the opening day of the 2014–15 season.

Source: soccerbase.com

Coaching staff 
Last updated 2 June 2014

Statistics

Appearances and goals 

Last Updated 15 May 2015

|-
!colspan=14|Players featured for Brentford on loan this season:

Source: brentfordfc.co.uk
Italic: denotes player is no longer with team

Goalscorers 

Last Updated 15 May 2015

Source: brentfordfc.co.uk
Italic: denotes player is no longer with team

Disciplinary record 

Last Updated 15 May 2015

Source: brentfordfc.co.uk
Italic: denotes player is no longer with team

Management 

Last Updated 15 May 2015

Summary 

Last Updated 15 May 2015

Transfers & loans

Kit 
The 2014–15 home kit was revealed on 2 June 2014 with a release date of 19 June 2014. adidas return as kit suppliers and SKYex continue their sponsorship for the third year.

|
|
|
|

Season events 
2 June Alan Judge signs from Blackburn Rovers on a three-year deal for an undisclosed fee.
5 June Alfie Mawson signs a 12-month extension to his Development Squad contract.
6 June Joe Maloney extends his Development Squad contract by 12 months.
7 June Jermaine Udumaga joins the Development Squad from Oxford United.
9 June Josh Clarke signs a new one-year deal.
25 June Marcos Tébar joins from UD Almería on a two-year deal. Clayton Donaldson turns down a new contract with Brentford and agrees to join Birmingham City.
26 June Stuart Dallas signs a new three-year deal.
27 June Moses Odubajo joins from Leyton Orient and Andre Gray joins from Luton Town, both on three year deals for undisclosed fees. David Button signs a new three-year deal. Emmanuel Oyeleke signs a one-year Development Squad contract extension.
28 June Lionel Stone and Kieran Morris sign one year Development Squad contracts.
29 June Tyrell Miller Rodney signs a 12-month Development Squad Contract.
30 June Montell Moore signs a new one year Development Squad contract.
3 July Luke Norris turns down a new contract and joins Gillingam.
17 July Alex Pritchard joins on a season long loan from Tottenham.
18 July Will Grigg joins MK Dons on a season long loan.
21 July Scott Hogan signs from Rochdale, signing a three-year deal for an undisclosed fee.
24 July Jake Bidwell signs a new three-year deal.
1 August Manager Mark Warburton, Assistant Manager David Weir and Sporting Director Frank McParland sign one-year rolling contracts with the club. Daniel O'Shaughnessy joins from FC Metz on a two-year contract.
7 August Tommy Smith joins on a one-year deal. Nick Proschwitz joins on a one-year contract on a free transfer from Hully City.
8 August Development Squad Goalkeeper Mark Smith joins Hitchin Town on loan until 4 September.
9 August Alfie Mawson joins Wycombe on loan until 7 September. Aaron Green joins the Development Squad on a one-year deal.
15 August Jota signs on a three-year deal from Celta de Vigo. Jon Toral signs on a season long loan from Arsenal. Montell Moore signs a three-year deal.
22 August Josh Clarke joins Dagenham & Redbridge on loan until 18 September.
25 August Brentford accept an offer from Wigan Athletic for midfielder Adam Forshaw after their valuation terms are met.
29 August Jake Reeves has his contract terminated by mutual consent, and subsequently signs for Swindon Town.
1 September Adam Forshaw signs for Wigan Athletic. Betinho joins on a season long loan from Sporting Lisbon. Alfie Mawson's loan at Wycombe Wanderers is extended until 1 January 2015.
19 September Alan McCormack signs a new two-year contract with an option for a third year.
23 September Josh Clarke returns from his loan period at Dagenham & Redbridge.
31 October Alan McCormack is ruled out for 3 months with an ankle ligament injury.
11 November Tony Craig signs a new contract keeping him at the club until 2017.
9 December Toumani Diagouraga signs a new two-year contract expiring in 2017.
2 January Richard Lee announces that he will retire at the end of the season. Jack Bonham signs a new contract keeping him at the club until 2018.
3 January Alfie Mawson's loan at Wycombe is extended until the end of the season.
14 January Josh Laurent joins the Development squad from QPR.
15 January Sam Saunders signs a new deal keeping him at the club until 2016.
19 January Montell Moore joins FC Midtjylland on loan for the rest of the season.
20 January Chris Long signs on a months loan from Everton.
22 January Tyrell Miller-Rodney joins Boreham Wood on a two-month loan.

Development squad

Squad 
Players' ages are as of the opening day of the 2014–15 senior season.

Source: brentfordfc.co.uk
Italic: denotes player is no longer with team

Professional Development League Two South Division 

For the 2014–15 season, Brentford are participating in the Professional Development League Two South Division. Teams are allowed to field three overage outfield players and one overage goalkeeper.

League table

Matches

References 

Brentford F.C. seasons
Brentford F.C.